Poli Huduga is a 1989 Kannada-language action drama film written by Paruchuri Brothers and directed by S. S. Ravichandra. The film cast includes V. Ravichandran, Karishma, Tara and Devaraj, while many other prominent actors featured in supporting roles. The soundtrack and score composition was by Hamsalekha. The film was a remake of Telugu film Kaliyuga Pandavulu.

Cast 
 V. Ravichandran 
 Karishma
 Tara 
 Devaraj
 Thoogudeepa Srinivas
 Jaggesh
 Mukhyamantri Chandru
 Doddanna
 Sundar Krishna Urs
 Umashri
 Avinash
 Dinesh
 Mysore Lokesh
 Jyothi

Soundtrack 
The music was composed and lyrics written by Hamsalekha and audio was bought by Lahari Music.

References

External links 

 Full movie

1989 films
1980s Kannada-language films
Indian action films
Films scored by Hamsalekha
Kannada remakes of Telugu films
1989 action films
Films directed by S. S. Ravichandra